BT, formerly BT Financial Group, is a financial services company based at Tower Two, International Towers Sydney in Sydney, Australia, with operations there and in New Zealand. Its product range includes managed investments, superannuation, insurance, and private banking. 

In 1969, BT began as the Australian subsidiary of the Bankers Trust Company of New York, Bankers Trust Australia.

BT is the wealth management arm of Westpac, a banking and other financial services company operating since 1817. 

BT has been granted a MySuper authority, enabling it to continue to receive default superannuation contribution from 1 Jan 2014.

BT - Financial Services Brands 

 Advance - Advance Asset Management Limited (Advance) is the specialist investment arm of the BT Financial Group.
 Ascalon - Ascalon Capital Managers has offices in Sydney and Hong Kong and forms strategic relationships with specialist investment managers throughout the Asia Pacific region. 
 Asgard

BT Emerging Designer Award 
The BT Emerging Designer Award is an annual event that aims to identify and showcase Australia’s most promising emerging fashion designers and provide support in the form of financial means, access to services and mentoring.

Previous Award Winners 
 Albus Lumen (2018)
 Kacey Devlin (2017)
 macgraw  (2016)
 Emma Mulholland (2015)
 Michael Lo Sordo (2014)
 Christopher Esber (2013)

References

Banks of Australia
Australian companies established in 1969
Financial services companies established in 1969
Banks established in 1969
Financial services companies based in Sydney
Westpac